The Rajarajeswari Peetam in Rush, New York is a Hindu temple that practices the teachings of SriVidya. Sri Chaitanyananda Natha Saraswathi (or Aiya, as they call him) is the peetathipathy of the temple along with Gnanamba (or Amma,) his wife. Aiya is a disciple of Sri Amritananda Natha Saraswathi who is the Peetathipathy of the Devipuram temple. The temple was founded in Zambia, then moved to the Aiya's home in Rush in New York state before the current, purpose-built temple was constructed.

The temple and its community have been the subject of an in-depth study by Corrine Dempsey.

Guru Lineage 

The Guru Lineage starts off with Dakshinamurthy (a teacher form of Shiva) who gave the knowledge to Balatripurasundari, who gave it to Dattatreya, and the lineage continued down until it eventually branched out to Srilasri Swaprakasananda Theertha Avadhootha, who gave it to  Sri Amritananda Natha Saraswathi, who on Friday, Oct. 5, 1979 gave initiation to Sri Chaitanyananda Natha Saraswathi (Aiya).

Sri Chaitanyananda Natha Saraswathi (Aiya) 
The ninth and last child of Sri. Sinnayya Pillai Navaratnam and Smt. Kamalambal, Sri Wijayaharan (Aiya) was born into a family of Devi upasakas. Worship of the Mother had been continuing in his father's family for more than six generations, but was abruptly halted in 1918 after the sudden demise of Sri Wijayaharan's paternal aunt. Sri Haran learnt of the tradition at the age of ten, from his father.

The young Haran wanted to revive the rich tradition of Devi worship in his family. The Devi's Blessings were with him the moment the desire to worship the Mother took form in his young heart.

After having graduated from the famous Jaffna College, Sri Haran received Shadakshara mantra dhiksha from the late Srilasri Sivasachithananda Mathaji, a paramahamsa sanyasini, the disciple of Srilasri Sivananda Saraswathi. He imbibed knowledge of the ritualistic practices under the tutelage of Sri Mataji and her disciple Srimati Selvanayaki Kalyanasundaram at the Sivananda Tapovanam in Thirukoneswaram.

Aiya emigrated to Zambia to work as an architect for the Government in Lusaka. In this small town, he met a few South Indian families and was touched by the true devotion for the divine that he found in them. The families assembled regularly for Satya Sai bhajans and Friday bhajans and the Haran family decided to commence regular Puja with the ever-growing circle of devotees and so, in 1976, regular chanting of the Lalita Sahasranama was started.

It was in Lusaka that Aiya met his present Guru, Srilasri Amritananda Saraswathi (Dr. N.P. Sastry) from Andhra Pradesh. He was overwhelmed by the compassionate eyes and depth of feeling he felt when he was first introduced to Sri Amritananda. He noticed Sri Amritananda performing the dashamudras during the recitation of the Lalita Sahasranama and decided to ask him for initiation into Sri Vidya. Sri Wijayaharan was showered with the grace and the priceless mantra on the Poornima day, Friday, Oct. 5, 1979. Sri Amritananda performed an eight-hour Navavarana puja at Aiya's house and initiated Aiya and his wife Srimati Sakuntala with the mantras. Aiya was then taught the intricacies of performing the various aspects of the mahayagna called the Navavarana puja.

Aiya moved to the United States in 1980. Named the "Kanchi Peetam" at first, the Peetam now known as the Sri Rajarajeswari Peetam was established in his own house. Worship of the Devi has been continuing at the Peetam and waves of devotees started to flock to Here. In the early part of 1981, during the morning puja, Aiya experienced Poornabhishekam by the Devi Herself and was given the dhiksha name of Sri Chaitanyananda. His wife Srimati Sakuntala was named Gnanamba. In that same year, during the Navaratri celebrations on the seventh evening, the Devi left an impression of a conch in Sri Chaitanyananda's right palm. And in 1984, Sri Chaitanyananda received the call to compile a comprehensive text on the intricacies of the Navavarana puja. Having tirelessly worked on this book for an entire year, the first edition was offered to Her lotus feet during the Sharada Navaratri.

Sri Gnanamba (Amma) 

Amma is the eldest daughter of Sattanathar Kumarasamy and Rajammah. Born in a village Thambachettyponpeedro in Eezham, she is the eldest of nine children. She was initiated into the Shiva Panchaksharam by Shiva Sachidananda Mataji in 1963 when she was studying in Ramanathan college in Chunnakam. She married Aiya in 1970 at Kadhirgamam in Ceylon and accompanied Aiya to Zambia in 1971. Amma was initiated into Sri Vidya by Guruji on October 5, 1979. She received Purna Diksha along with Aiya and was named Gnanamba by the Devi. In her ancestry is one of the greatest Tamil luminaries - "Sadhavadhani" Kadhirvel Pillai, a person who could concentrate on one hundred different things at the same instant. He is well known for his literary works, especially his commentary on Tiruvacakam, which has no equal to date. Amma plays the supporting role of an upasaka to the hilt and she teaches by example.

Sri Chaitanyananda and Gnanamba have opened their hearts, home and the Peetam to all devotees who hail from every part of the world. Aiya's love for Tamil literature, Carnatic music and vedic incantations flows out through the unique style of worship that he has developed. The Sri Rajarajeswari Peetam has mothered more than 100 affiliated Peetams all over the world.

Sri Amritananda Natha Saraswathi (Guruji) 
Sri Amritananda Natha Saraswathi (Dr.N. Prahalada Sastry) was born in Visakhapatnam, the first child of Sri Narasimha Rao and Srimati Lakshminarasamma. Guruji, as he is referred to, started his spiritual quest at a very young age. Blessed with divine experiences early in his childhood, his young mind was teeming with questions, searching for the truth. The stage was set for his spiritual inclination that was to intensify later in life.
In the course of time, his interest turned to science. He graduated from the Andhra University with a masters in Nuclear physics and received his doctorate from the University of Bombay, while working at the Tata Institute of Fundamental Research. Guruji spent 23 years at TIFR, involved in research. In the final years there, he was working on a defense project for the air defense. But his spiritually inclined conscience was not comfortable with the destructive nature of his research.

In the meantime, in 1977, Guruji visited the Balaji temple in Hyderabad. He went in and prostrated before the Lord. He felt an extreme thrill pass through his body; and Guruji had his first initiation from Balaji, that is Balatripurasundari. This proved to be the turning point in his life. After deep thought, he decided to look into the spiritual aspects a little deeper and devote time to work for the upliftment of society. He received SriVidya Poorna Dhiksha from Sri Swaprakashananda Natha Thirtha Avadhutha of Anakapalli. And he was showered with the Grace of Devi Saraswathi and given the dhiksha name of Sri Amritananda Natha Saraswathi.

Involved in defense research at TIFR, his mind was in search of the truth within himself. It was at this juncture that he was offered a position of Professor of Physics at the University of Zambia in Zambia. Realising that this was an opportunity to take a fresh look at one's self, he accepted a two-year contract to work in Zambia. It was there that Guruji met his "spiritual son", Sri Wijayaharan and accepted him as his disciple, in SriVidya upasana.

Guruji returned to India in 1981. He resigned from TIFR and settled down in Visakhapatnam, into SriVidya upasana and worship of the Devi. He slowly started working on means to help improve the standard of living of his fellow men.

In 1983, during Devi yagna, Guruji was approached by the brothers of the Putrevu family, with a request to build a temple for the divine Mother. Having acquired the land, Guruji was looking for divine guidance, a sign of approval to commence construction of the temple.

In the vicinity of the donated land, there was a small hillock where Guruji would often spend time in meditation. On the slopes of the hillock, he noticed a formation very similar to that of the Kamakhya Peetam in Assam. One day, while in meditation he experienced himself lying on the Peetam, while four others were performing a homam with the flames emanating from his body. And during purnahuthi, he felt a heavy object being placed on his heart. Awakening from his meditative state, Guruji was prompted to dig that site. Unearthed from that very spot, he found a Sri Chakra MahaMeru made of panchauloha. It was later discovered that a huge yagna had been performed in that area more than 250 years ago.

Guruji had visions of the Devi as a sixteen-year-old girl. With her blessings, he built the Kamakhya Peetam on the hillock and a Siva temple on the peak, in 1984. Construction of the Sri Meru Nilaya in Devipuram was started in 1985. The temple has the idols of all the Devis described in the Devi Khadgamala stotra. The temple construction was completed in 1994 and the kumbhabhishekam celebrated with great pomp and piety. This temple is unique in allowing the devotees to perform puja to the Devi themselves, without distinction of caste or creed.

Srilasri Swaprakasananda Theertha Avadhootha (Gurugaru) 
Fondly known to his disciples as Gurugaru, Swami Srilasri Swaprakasananda theertha avadhootha was born in 1915 in a small village, Vidurbarthi in Andhra Pradesh. Hailing from the Dattatreya lineage, Sri Swaprakasananda had not received any formal education, yet with the Mother's Blessings, has vast knowledge of the Vedas and Sastras and is well versed in Sanskrit.

Sri Gurugaru came in contact with some of India's finest spiritual gurus during his twentieth year. He received Dhiksha from Sri Poornananda Yogi, a disciple of the Tibetan guru, Maru Maharishi. He was introduced to SriVidya upasana by Sri Kesari Kameswara Rao of the Madhvacharya sampradaya. In his 32nd year, Sri Gurugaru received Dhiksha in the mahavidyas of Sri Rajarajeswari, Vanadurga and Saptasathi Chandi. He attained Poorna dhiksha from Sri Gnanananda Saraswathi of Anakapalli.

He travelled the length and breadth of India to enhance his spiritual knowledge. By the time he was 40 years old, he had mastered the 64 tantras, from Orissa and Rajamandri. At 43, he had learnt 70 million mantras from the teachings of 18 peetams and many gurus. He spent a few years in Kasi contemplating and analysing the source of the mantras he had learnt. He was greatly aided by Sri Dakshinamurthi Paramahamsa of Lalithanagar, Visakhapatnam.

In addition to the siddhis he had already received, he became a vedic scholar at the age of 58 with the grace of Chintamani Mahavidyeswari.

By 1980, in his 65th year, Sri Gurugaru felt the urge to renounce the material world and take up sanyasi. To this end, he travelled to the Sri Bhadrakali Mahapeetam at Haridhwar's Saptarishi sarovar. Sanyasa dhiksha was showered on him by Srilasri Kalyanananda Bharathi theertha Maharaj. Years later, with his Guru's blessings, Sri Gurugaru took up the Avadhootha Ashram.

Sri Gurugaru attained Maha Samathy on Gurupoornima day year 2002.

Gallery

See also
 Devi
 Devipuram
 Hindu Gods
 Sri Chakra

References

External links
 
 Srí Rájarajewari Peetam Homepage

Hindu temples in New York (state)
Buildings and structures in Monroe County, New York
Tourist attractions in Monroe County, New York
Indian-American culture in New York (state)
Hinduism in the United States